Adele Farrington (1867 – 19 December 1936) was an American actress of the silent film era.

Biography
Born Anna King in Brooklyn, New York, Farrington was a stage actress before appearing in 74 films between 1914 and 1926. She was a relatively old actress for the silent film era, being 47 at the beginning of her film career. She appeared in many films directed by Lois Weber and Phillips Smalley. Her husband was film director and actor Hobart Bosworth, in whose films she also often appeared. They divorced and Bosworth remarried to a younger woman and had a small child by 1920. She died in Los Angeles, California.

Selected filmography
 False Colors (1914)
 It's No Laughing Matter (1915)
 Hypocrites (1915)
The Devil's Bondwoman (1916)
 The Love Girl (1916)
 The Mate of the Sally Ann (1917)
 The House of Silence (1918)
 Such a Little Pirate (1918)
 Putting It Over (1919)
 A Fugitive from Matrimony (1919)
 In Old Kentucky (1919)
 Too Much Johnson (1919)
 The Mollycoddle (1920)
 The Girl in the Web (1920)
 Rio Grande (1920)
 One Hour Before Dawn (1920)
 The Palace of Darkened Windows (1920)
 Black Beauty (1921)
 The Child Thou Gavest Me (1921)
 Her Mad Bargain (1921)
 The Spenders (1921)
 The Charm School (1921)
 A Connecticut Yankee in King Arthur's Court (1921)
 Bobbed Hair (1922)
 The Scarlet Lily (1923)
 One Stolen Night (1923)
 Bag and Baggage (1923)
 The Man Next Door (1923)
 A Gentleman of Leisure (1923)
 Shadow of the Law (1926)
 The Traffic Cop (1926)

External links

1867 births
1936 deaths
American film actresses
American silent film actresses
People from Brooklyn
20th-century American actresses
Actresses from New York City